Hemieuxoa is a genus of moths of the family Noctuidae.

Species
 Hemieuxoa rudens (Harvey, 1874)

References

Natural History Museum Lepidoptera genus database
Hemieuxoa at funet

Noctuinae